Natalya Voronova may refer to:

 Natalya Pomoshchnikova-Voronova (born 1965), Russian sprinter
 Natalya Voronova (rower) (born 1986), Kazakhstani rower